Leng Tch'e is the fourth release from John Zorn's band Naked City. It consists of a single track, running at just over half an hour. It was first released on the Japanese Toys Factory label in 1992. Unlike Naked City's previously material, which was known for its fast tempo and rapid transitions between a variety of heterogeneous styles, Leng Tch'e is a more avant-garde take on sludge metal. It was reissued in 1997 along with Torture Garden in the double-disc collection Black Box.

The cover photograph features a Chinese man being subjected to the Leng Tch'e method of torture, the overarching theme of the piece.

Bataille quote
From the liner notes:

The liner notes present an abridgment of Bataille's remarks on p. 206–207 of Tears of Eros.

Bataille also wrote about the photograph in Inner Experience:
"In particular, I would gaze at the photographic image – or sometimes the memory which I have of it – of a Chinese man who must have been tortured in my lifetime. Of this torture, I had had in the past a series of successive representations. In the end, the patient writhed, his chest flayed, arms and legs cut off at the elbows and at the knees. His hair standing on end, hideous, hagard, striped with blood, beautiful as a wasp."

Track listing 
Composition by John Zorn

"Leng Tch'e" – 31:37

Personnel 
John Zorn – alto sax, vocals
Bill Frisell – guitar
Wayne Horvitz – keyboards
Fred Frith – bass
Joey Baron – drums
Yamatsuka Eye – vocals

Liner notes 
Published by Theatre of Musical Optics, BMI
Produced by John Zorn
Recorded by Alec Head
Mastered by Bob Ludwig
Design: Tomoyo T.L.
Thanks: Patton, the Melvins

References 

1992 EPs
Albums produced by John Zorn
Naked City (band) albums